Clionella semicostata is a species of sea snail, a marine gastropod mollusk in the family Clavatulidae.

Description
The size of an adult shell varies between 15 mm and 32 mm. The whorls are with shallow channel above. The shoulder angle is situated above or at the middle of the whorl. The body whorl has an obconical shape.  The yellowish-brown to dark brown periphery of the shell is nodulous by the terminations of short, oblique, rather distant axial ribs (numbering 12-14). The spiral striae are faint to distinct. The anal sinus is broad. The color of the shell is a uniform light yellowish brown.

Distribution
This marine species occurs from False Bay to Cape Agulhas, South Africa

References

 Kilburn, R.N. (1985). Turridae (Mollusca: Gastropoda) of southern Africa and Mozambique. Part 2. Subfamily Clavatulinae. Ann. Natal Mus. 26(2), 417–470.

External links
 

Endemic fauna of South Africa
semicostata
Gastropods described in 1840